Tórmóður Sigurðsson (or Tormod Sigurdsson) (died 1531) was, from 1524 to 1531, lawman (prime minister) of the Faroe Islands.

References

G.V.C. Young's textbook Færøerne - fra vikingetiden til reformationen, 1982 
Løgtingið 150 - Hátíðarrit. Tórshavn 2002, Bind 2, S. 366. (Avsnitt Føroya løgmenn fram til 1816) (PDF-Download)

1531 deaths
Lawmen of the Faroe Islands
Year of birth unknown
16th-century heads of government
16th-century Norwegian people